Muhammad Amour Chomboh (born 25 January 1953) is a Tanzanian CCM politician and Member of Parliament for Magomeni Constituency since 2005.

References

1953 births
Living people
Tanzanian Muslims
Chama Cha Mapinduzi MPs
Tanzanian MPs 2010–2015
Institute of Finance Management alumni